The Marks of the Church are those things by which the True Church may be recognized in Protestant theology. Three marks are usually enumerated: the preaching of the Word, the administration of the sacraments, and church discipline.

The Belgic Confession devotes a chapter (Article 29) to the "Marks of the True Church" and lists them as follows:

The Anglican Thirty-nine Articles states in chapter 19:

{{quote|The visible Church of Christ is a congregation of faithful men, in which the pure Word of God is preached, and the Sacraments be duly ministered according to Christ’s ordinance, in all those things that of necessity are requisite to the same.}}

Louis Berkhof notes that Reformed theologians have differed as to the number of marks: Theodore Beza spoke of only one (preaching), John Calvin and Heinrich Bullinger spoke of two (preaching and sacraments), while Peter Martyr and Zacharias Ursinus spoke of three – preaching, sacraments and discipline. Nevertheless, Edmund Clowney points out that Calvin "included discipline in the proper observance of the sacraments." Albert Mohler calls church discipline the "missing mark" of the church.

See also

 Chicago-Lambeth Quadrilateral
 Means of grace
 On the Councils and the Church''
 One true church

References

Ecclesiology
Calvinist theology
Christian terminology